Gorodovikovsk (Bääşñtä) is a town and the administrative center of Gorodovikovsky District of the Republic of Kalmykia, Russia, located on the Bashantenon River,  west of Elista. Population:  It was previously known as Bashanta (until 1971).

History

It was founded in 1872 as a Kalmyk settlement of Bashanta. It was granted urban-type settlement status in 1938. In 1971, it was granted town status and renamed Gorodovikovsk after the Hero of the Soviet Union Oka Gorodovikov, who was of Kalmyk origin.

Administrative and municipal status
Within the framework of administrative divisions, Gorodovikovsk serves as the administrative center of Gorodovikovsky District. As an administrative division, it is incorporated within Gorodovikovsky District as the Town of Gorodovikovsk. As a municipal division, the Town of Gorodovikovsk is incorporated within Gorodovikovsky Municipal District as Gorodovikovskoye Urban Settlement.

Touristic attractions

References

Notes

Sources

External links
Official website of Gorodovikovsk 
Gorodovikovsk Business Directory  

Cities and towns in Kalmykia
Gorodovikovsky District
Populated places established in 1872
1872 establishments in the Russian Empire